Roberto Rivera Ruiz de Porras (born October 28, 1950) is a Puerto Rican politician affiliated with the Popular Democratic Party (PPD). He has been a member of the Puerto Rico House of Representatives since 2001 representing District 39. Since 2013, he is serving as Speaker pro tempore of the House of Representatives of Puerto Rico.

Early years and studies

Roberto Rivera Ruiz de Porras was born in Ponce on October 28, 1950. He studied at the Colegio San Juan Bosco in the Barrio Cantera.

Rivera Ruiz de Porras completed a degree in Business Management from Caribbean University.

Professional career

Rivera worked for 29 years in the banking industry.

Political career

Rivera began his political career when he became a member of the Municipal Assembly of Carolina in 1989. He served in that position until 2000, when he decided to run for the House of Representatives of Puerto Rico representing District 40. He was elected at the 2000 general election.

Rivera was reelected in 2004, 2008, and 2012. After being reelected in that last election, he was appointed as the House's Speaker pro tempore.

Personal life

Rivera is married and has two children.

References

|-

External links
Roberto Rivera Ruiz de Porras Official biography
Roberto Rivera Ruiz de PorrasProfile on WAPA-TV

Living people
1950 births
Popular Democratic Party members of the House of Representatives of Puerto Rico
Politicians from Ponce
Speakers of the House of Representatives of Puerto Rico